Zephrini Lee (born June 17, 1963) is a former American football player who played three seasons in the National Football League with the Denver Broncos and Los Angeles Raiders. He was drafted by the Los Angeles Raiders in the ninth round of the 1986 NFL Draft. He played college football at the University of Southern California and attended Abraham Lincoln High School in San Francisco, California. Lee was also a member of the Saskatchewan Roughriders, Sacramento Attack, Arizona Rattlers and Miami Hooters.

Professional career

Los Angeles Raiders
Lee was selected by the Los Angeles Raiders with the 246th pick in the 1986 NFL Draft. He spent the 1986 season on the injured reserve list. He was released by the Raiders after the team's third preseason game in 1987.

Denver Broncos
Lee signed with the Denver Broncos as a replacement player during the 1987 NFL players' strike and played in one game for the team before being released.

Los Angeles Raiders
Lee then signed with the Los Angeles Raiders and played in the final two replacement games. He remained on the team after the strike was over and converted to safety late in the season. He played in 21 games, starting seven, as a safety from 1988 to 1989. Lee was released by the Raiders on July 23, 1991.

Saskatchewan Roughriders
Lee spent time on the Saskatchewan Roughriders' practice roster in 1992.

Sacramento Attack
Lee played for the Sacramento Attack during the 1992 season.

Arizona Rattlers
Lee played for the Arizona Rattlers in 1994. The Rattlers won ArenaBowl VIII against the Orlando Predators on September 2, 1994.

Miami Hooters
Lee played for the Miami Hooters during the 1995 season.

Personal life
Lee earned his master's degree from the University of Regina. His son Ira Lee is currently a senior for the Arizona Wildcats men's college basketball team.

References

External links
Just Sports Stats
College stats

Living people
1963 births
Players of American football from San Francisco
American football running backs
American football safeties
African-American players of American football
USC Trojans football players
Denver Broncos players
Los Angeles Raiders players
Sacramento Attack players
Arizona Rattlers players
Miami Hooters players
University of Regina alumni
21st-century African-American people
20th-century African-American sportspeople